The Berber Latin alphabet is the version of the Latin alphabet used to write the Berber languages. It was adopted in the 19th century, using varieties of letters.

History
The Berber languages were originally written using the ancient Libyco-Berber script and then centuries later by the Tuareg Tifinagh script in Tuareg language areas, of which the Neo-Tifinagh alphabet/abjad is the modern development.

The use of a Latin script for Berber has its roots in European (French and Italian) colonial expeditions to North Africa. Dictionaries and glossaries written with Latin letters, ordered alphabetically and following European orthography (mainly French) began to appear in print in the 19th century, they were intended to the colonial administration, traders and military officers. With the arrival of linguists specialized in Semitic languages there emerged a system based on Semitic romanization conventions: diacritics were used, and dictionary entries were now ordered by root. This system has since become the most common way of Berber transcription in scientific documents and literature.

Various writing standards were used since the 19th century, some are phonetically oriented, other phonologically oriented. While the Tuareg languages use a phonetically oriented transcription, the northern Berber languages use on the other hand a mixed transcription, the latter is recommended by the French institute of languages, INALCO and has been adopted by the HCA in Algeria and IRCAM in Morocco (although in Neo-Tifinagh).

Northern-Berber Latin alphabet

The Berber Latin alphabet of Northern-Berber usually consists of 34 letters:

 23 standard Latin letters, all found in the English alphabet except for O, P, and V. However, these three are also used by some in modern Berber texts.
 11 additional modified Latin letters: Č Ḍ Ɛ Ǧ Ɣ Ḥ Ř Ṛ Ṣ Ṭ Ẓ.
 The labialization mark "ʷ" is added to some letters in some Berber dialects, producing: bʷ, gʷ, ɣʷ, kʷ, mʷ, nʷ, qʷ, and xʷ. However, these are usually not considered as independent letters of the Berber Latin alphabet.

{| class="wikitable" style="text-align:center"
|bgcolor="#EFEFEF" colspan="34"| The 34-Letter Alphabet of Northern-Berber
|- style="font-size:120%" class="Unicode"
|width="3%"|A||width="3%"|B||width="3%"|C||width="3%"|Č||width="3%"|D||width="3%"|Ḍ||width="3%"|E||width="3%"|Ɛ||width="3%"|F||width="3%"|G||width="3%"|Ǧ||width="3%"|Ɣ||width="3%"|H||width="3%"|Ḥ||width="3%"|I||width="3%"|J||width="3%"|K||width="3%"|L||width="3%"|M||width="3%"|N||width="3%"|Q||width="3%"|R||width="3%"|Ř||width="3%"|Ṛ||width="3%"|S||width="3%"|Ṣ||width="3%"|T||width="3%"|Ṭ||width="3%"|U||width="3%"|W||width="3%"|X||width="3%"|Y||width="3%"|Z||width="3%"|Ẓ
|-
|bgcolor="#EFEFEF" colspan="34"| Lower case
|- style="font-size:120%"
|width="3%"|a||width="3%"|b||width="3%"|c||width="3%"|č||width="3%"|d||width="3%"|ḍ||width="3%"|e||width="3%"|ɛ||width="3%"|f||width="3%"|g||width="3%"|ǧ||width="3%"|ɣ||width="3%"|h||width="3%"|ḥ||width="3%"|i||width="3%"|j||width="3%"|k||width="3%"|l||width="3%"|m||width="3%"|n||width="3%"|q||width="3%"|r||width="3%"|ř||width="3%"|ṛ||width="3%"|s||width="3%"|ṣ||width="3%"|t||width="3%"|ṭ||width="3%"|u||width="3%"|w||width="3%"|x||width="3%"|y||width="3%"|z||width="3%"|ẓ
|}

In Northern-Berber texts, foreign words and names are written in their original form even if they contain the letters: O, P, V, or any other non-Berber letter (like: Ü, ẞ, Å, ...). According to SIL, the letter P is used in Kabyle.

Berber Latin alphabet and the Tifinagh Berber alphabet  
The following table shows the Northern-Berber Latin alphabet with its Neo-Tifinagh and Arabic equivalents:

The letter "O" does occur often in Tuareg-Berber orthography and sometimes in Northern Berber. In Northern-Berber orthography it usually corresponds to the letter "U".

In the interest of pan-dialectal legibility, the Berber Latin alphabet omits the partly phonemic contrasts found in some Berber language varieties (notably the Kabyle language and Riffian Berber) between stops and fricatives.

Phonemic labiovelarization of consonants is widespread in Berber varieties, but there are rarely minimal pairs and it is unstable (e.g. ameqqʷran "large", in the Ainsi dialect of Kabyle, is pronounced ameqqran in At Yanni Kabyle-Berber, only a few kilometers away). The INALCO standard uses the diacritic  for labiovelarization only when needed to distinguish words, e.g. ireggel vs. iregg°el.

In all other cases  is used, e.g. tarakna "carpet" (pronounced taṛakna). Exceptional cases of other emphatics, e.g. "hound", are ignored (i.e. written as uccay).

Rif-Berber usages
In most Riffian areas (northern Morocco), the letter "L" in the word alɣem is pronounced [ařɣem]. "Ř" is pronounced as something between "L" and "R".

Riffian Berbers pronounce the "LL" (in a word like yelli, "my daughter") like "dj" or "ǧǧ" (yedji). Depending on the author's whim, this might be represented in writing as "ll", "dj", a single "ǧ", or "ǧǧ".

Souss-Berber local usage
In Souss (mid-southern Morocco), Berber writers rarely use the neutral vowel "e", because the unphonemic schwa is rarer in Tachelhit due to a different stress system than its sister languages.

Kabyle-Berber local usages
However these affricates are uncommon in other dialects (except in Riffian) and they are morphologically conditioned, so for the sake of pan-dialectal legibility the INALCO standard omits them. In the former case the INALCO standard uses , and in the second it uses  (e.g. yettawi vs. ifessi deriving from the verb fsi).

Labiovelarization is indicated with the superscript letter  (examples: kʷ, gʷ), or with the "degree sign": "°" (examples: k°, g°), or simply by using the letter .  may represent spirantization.

, Greek upper case sigma, since Greek upper case epsilon "Ε" is visually indistinguishable from Latin upper case E
, Greek small letter epsilon (Unicode U+03B5)
 Greek capital and small letter gamma (Unicode U+0393, U+03B3)

Among non-Kabyle Berber writers a number of alternative letters are used:

Controversy
There has been a long and fierce debate on whether to use the Latin, Tifinagh, or Arabic alphabets for Berber in Algeria and Morocco, between Berber activists and anti-Berber establishments, mainly those with an Arab-Islamic orientation. Berber activists overwhelmingly favor the use of the Latin alphabet in order to ensure a quick development and proliferation of the Berber language (Tamazight) in schools, in public institutions, and on the internet. A small number of them prefer the Neo-Tifinagh alphabet. The states of Morocco and Algeria usually distance themselves from Latin-based Berber writing, fearing that it would strengthen the position of Berber against Arabic and French, and thus leading to a stronger Berber political activism. The Arab-Islamic establishments and political parties often reject the Latin alphabet as a Berber alphabet for the same reasons, and they usually brand it as a tool to westernize and Christianize Berbers.

In 2003, Mohammed VI of Morocco approved the Royal Institute of the Amazigh Culture (IRCAM) Berber Institute's decision of using Neo-Tifinagh as the sole official alphabet for the Berber language in Morocco. The IRCAM's decision was met with much disapproval among independent Berber activists and they saw it as a way of neutralizing Berber and preventing it from quick flourishing and development.

Southern-Berber Latin alphabet (Tuareg)
The Southern-Berber (Tuareg) Latin alphabet is made of 36 letters. They are mostly Latin letters with one IPA character and one Greek letter incorporated.

The vowel O is used in the Latin alphabet of Southern Berber (Tuareg), but is also used in some (but not all) Northern Berber languages. The vowel "O" in Tuareg words mostly corresponds to "U" in Northern Berber words.

Tawellemet and Tamajaq also use Ââ Êê F̣f̣ G̣g̣ Îî J̣j̣ Ḳḳ Ṃṃ Ṇṇ Ôô Ṛṛ Ṣṣ Ṣ̌ṣ̌ Ûû Ẉẉ

The Malian national literacy program DNAFLA has proposed a standard for the Latin alphabet, which is used with modifications in Karl G. Prasse's Tuareg French Dictionary and the government literacy program in Burkina. In Niger a slightly different system was used. There is also some variation in Tifinagh and in the Arabic script.

In Burkina Faso the emphatics are denoted by "hooked" letters, as in Fula, e.g. .

See also

Tifinagh

References

Bibliography

 Tira n Tmaziɣt: Propositions pour la notation usuelle à base latine du berbère (Atelier du 24–25 juin 1996, INALCO/CRB ; synthèse des travaux par S. Chaker), Études et documents berbères, 14, 1997, p. 239–253.
Kamal Nait-Zerrad. Grammaire moderne du kabyle, tajerrumt tatrart n teqbaylit. Éditions KARTHALA, 2001.

External links
Kabyle alphabet on Omniglot

Latin alphabets
A
Writing systems of Africa
Romanization